Guðlaugur Friðþórsson (born 24 September 1961) is an Icelandic fisherman who survived six hours in  cold water after his fishing vessel had capsized and furthermore trekked, for another three hours, across lava fields to reach a town for help in freezing conditions.

Sequence of events
On 11 March 1984, Guðlaugur and four other fishermen were fishing near the Westman Islands when their boat, which was engaging in fishing and carrying trenchers to another village, capsized at about 10 p.m. It is suspected that the weight of the trenchers was miscalculated, causing the boat to be more susceptible to turbulent ocean conditions.

During the sinking of their boat, off the coast of Heimaey in Vestmannaeyjar, Guðlaugur and two out of four other companions climbed on to the keel. After about 45 minutes, they swam towards the shore, yet the other two disappeared within 10 minutes. He remained clear-headed throughout.

Reaching the shore of Heimaey, Guðlaugur found himself at the most dangerous section of the island's coastline, due mainly to the waves hitting the coastal lava rock formations. After searching for and finding a suitable, flatter part of the shoreline, he finally got to land but had to walk with bare feet, traversing  of volcanic scree. When he knocked on a door at 7 a.m., nine hours after the boat had sunk, he was taken to the hospital. Guðlaugur's body temperature was below  yet he showed almost no symptoms of hypothermia or vasodilatation, only of dehydration.

Testing
In autumn 1985, Jóhann Axelsson, head of Department of Physiology at the University of Iceland in Reykjavík, who had included Guðlaugur in an ongoing study about hypothermia, took Guðlaugur to London to see William Keatinge of the Physiology Department of the London Hospital Medical College and an expert in hypothermia. Together, they demonstrated that the 23-year old,  Icelander had phenomenal resistance to cold.

See also
The Deep – 2012 movie based on Guðlaugur's survival story

Footnotes

References

1961 births
Living people
Gudlaugur Fridthorsson
Shipwreck survivors